The year 2022 will be the eighth year in the history of the Rizin Fighting Federation, a mixed martial arts promotion based in Japan. It started broadcasting through a television agreement with Fuji Television. In North America and Europe Rizin FF is available on PPV all over the world and on live-now.

Background
Nobuyuki Sakakibara announced that Rizin is planning to work in copromotion between K-1 and RISE to hold in June the megafight between Tenshin Nasukawa and Takeru Segawa.

List of events

Rizin Women's Super Atomweight Grand Prix 2022 bracket

1 Anastasiya Svetkivska replaced an injured Rena Kubota.

Rizin Trigger 2

Rizin Trigger 2 was a Combat sport event held by Rizin Fighting Federation on February 23, 2022, at the Ecopa Arena in Fukuroi, Japan.

Background
A featherweight bout between Kleber Koike Erbst and Ulka Sasaki was scheduled as the event headliner.

Results

Rizin Landmark 2

Rizin Landmark 2 was a Combat sport event held by Rizin Fighting Federation on March 6, 2022, in Japan.

Background
A featherweight bout between Chihiro Suziki and the Ren Hiramoto is scheduled as the event headliner.

Results

Rizin 34 – Osaka

Rizin 34 – Osaka was a Combat sport event held by Rizin Fighting Federation on March 20, 2022, at the Maruzen Intec Arena in Osaka, Japan.

With this event, Rizin reaches the same total of numbered events as PRIDE FC did at the time of its final show.

Background
A featherweight bout between Satoshi Yamasu and Kyohei Hagiwara was scheduled as the event headliner.

A bantamweight kickboxing bout between Taiga Kawabe and Ryo Takahashi was scheduled for the event.

Results

Rizin Trigger 3

Rizin Trigger 3 will be a Combat sport event held by Rizin Fighting Federation on April 16, 2022, at the Musashino Forest Sport Plaza in Chōfu, Japan.

Background

Results

Rizin 35

Rizin 35 was a Combat sport event held by Rizin Fighting Federation on April 17, 2022, at the Musashino Forest Sport Plaza in Chōfu, Japan.

Background
A Rizin Super Atomweight Championship bout between the reigning champion Ayaka Hamasaki and Seika Izawa was scheduled for the event.

A Rizin Featherweight Championship rematch between the reigning champion Juntaro Ushiku and the former champion Yutaka Saito was scheduled for the event.

A Rizin Lightweight Championship rematch between the reigning champion Roberto de Souza and Johnny Case was scheduled for the event.

Results

Rizin Landmark 3 

Rizin Landmark 3 was a Combat sport event held by Rizin Fighting Federation on May 5, 2022, in Japan.

Background

Fight Card

The Match 2022

THE MATCH 2022 was a Kickboxing event held by Rizin Fighting Federation  in partnership with K-1 and RISE on June 19, 2022, in Tokyo, Japan.

Background
The main event will feature the megafight between the RISE Featherweight champion Tenshin Nasukawa and the K-1 Super Featherweight champion Takeru Segawa.

Results

Rizin 36 – Okinawa

Rizin 36 was a Combat sport event held by Rizin Fighting Federation on July 2, 2022, in Okinawa, Japan.

Background
A bantamweight bout between the former Rizin bantamweight champion Kai Asakura and the unbeaten Ji Yong Yang was scheduled as the event headliner. Asakura withdrew from the fight on June 30, as he had re-injured his right hand. Suzuki vs. Hiramoto was made the new main event.

A featherweight bout between two former kickboxers, Hiroaki Suzuki and Ren Hiramoto, was booked as the co-main event.

Fight Card

Rizin 37 - Saitama

Rizin 37 - Saitama will be a Combat sport event held by Rizin Fighting Federation on July 2, 2022, in Okinawa, Japan.

Background
The quarerfinal bouts of the 2022 Rizin Super Atomweight Grand Prix were held at the event.

A flyweight bout between Makoto Takahashi and the 44-year old veteran Hideo Tokoro and booked for the event.

The 2016 Olympic Games wrestling silver medalist Shinobu Ota was scheduled to face Yuki Motoya in his fourth professional bout.

Yoshiki Nakahara was initially scheduled to face Ulka Sasaki at the event, but Sasaki tested positive for COVID-19 and was replaced by Tetsuya Seki.

Fight Card

Super Rizin & Rizin 38

Super Rizin & Rizin 38 was a combat sport event held by Rizin Fighting Federation in partnership with The Money Team on September 25, 2022, at the Saitama Super Arena in Japan. The event was split into two parts: Super Rizin, which catered to foreign audiences, and Rizin 38, which began five hours later. Both cards were broadcast by Rizin Stream Pass and Abema.

Background
The event was headlined by an exhibition boxing match between the boxing great Floyd Mayweather Jr. and Japanese mixed martial artist and YouTuber Mikuru Asakura.

The 2021 Rizin Bantamweight Grand Prix winner Hiromasa Ougikubo faced current Road FC Featherweight champion (also former ONE Bantamweight World Champion) Soo Chul Kim in a bantamweight non-title bout.

The Rizin Super Atomweight Grand Prix Semifinals bouts took place during the event, which saw Si Woo Park face Ayaka Hamasaki and Seika Izawa face Anastasiya Svetkivska. Izawa was originally expected to face Rena Kubota, who was forced to withdraw due to injury.

Results

Rizin 39

Rizin 39 was a Combat sport event held by Rizin Fighting Federation on October 23, 2022, at the Marine Messe Fukuoka in Japan.

Background
A Rizin Featherweight Championship bout between current champion Juntarou Ushiku and former KSW Featherweight Champion Kleber Koike Erbst was scheduled as the main event.

A bantamweight kickboxing bout between Trent Girdham and the former Rajadamnern Stadium bantamweight champion Genji Umeno was announced for the event.

Results

Rizin Landmark Vol.4

Rizin Landmark Vol.4 was a Combat sport event held by Rizin Fighting Federation on November 6, 2022, at the Dolphins Arena in Japan.

Background
A bantamweight bout between Satoshi Yamasu and Ren Hiramoto was booked as the main event.

Fight Card

Rizin 40: Rizin X Bellator

Rizin 40: Rizin X Bellator will be a Combat sport event held by Rizin Fighting Federation and Bellator MMA on December 31, 2022, at the Saitama Super Arena in Japan.

Fight Card

See also
List of current Rizin FF fighters
 2022 in UFC
 2022 in Bellator MMA
 2022 in ONE Championship
 2022 in Absolute Championship Akhmat
 2022 in Konfrontacja Sztuk Walki
 2022 in AMC Fight Nights 
 2022 in Brave Combat Federation
 2022 in Road FC
 2022 Professional Fighters League season
 2022 in Eagle Fighting Championship
 2022 in Legacy Fighting Alliance

References

External links
 Official event
 

Rizin Fighting Federation
Rizin
2022 in Japanese sport
2022 sport-related lists